Apocalypse of Pseudo-Ephraem is a pseudoepigraphical text attributed to the church father Ephrem the Syrian. Two distinct documents have survived — one in Syriac and one in Latin. The Syriac document focuses on apocalyptic themes through the lens of Middle Eastern events which took place at the time it was written. Confusion exists around the Pseudo-Ephraem text primarily because of its doubtful authorship and date, differences between the Syriac and Latin versions, the small number of extant manuscripts, and the limited study that has been conducted of the text. Additionally, many extant works have been ascribed to Ephrem despite his authorship of these documents being doubtful. This has created significant difficulty in the area of textual criticism.

T. L. Frazier states, "Collections of works ascribed to Ephrem exist in several languages, the largest body of texts being Greek. Nearly all the surviving texts attributed to Ephrem in languages other than Syriac and Armenian are derived from this Greek corpus, including the Latin corpus."

Dating 

Scholars are divided on the origins of this apocalypse, which is commonly ascribed to a pseudonymous author rather than Ephrem (A.D. 306–373). As an example, C. P. Caspari (Latin text editor) and Paul Alexander advanced a date after the demise of Ephrem in 373. Caspari suggested a date between late 6th and early 7th centuries. Alexander argues that the work was originally written at the end of the 4th century but only reached its final form by the late 6th to early 7th centuries. These scholars strongly doubt that Pseudo-Ephraem is the actual work of Ephraem the Syrian. Yet, both Caspari and Alexander consider Pseudo-Ephraem to be greatly influenced by the actual work of Ephraem.

The Latin text is suggested to be dated somewhere between the 4th to 8th centuries. There appears to be little relation between the Syriac and Latin, and the Latin may be earlier or later than the Syriac document. The Latin's relation to the Greek texts is uncertain.

Pre-Tribulationism

The text has been used to argue that a pretribulational rapture view existed in the early church, the book stating "All the saints and elect of God are gathered together before the tribulation, which is to come, and are taken to the Lord, in order that they may not see."

Different documents translated by different translators 
A translation by Professor John C. Reeves, from the Syriac text published by Edmund Beck, is available from the Department of Religious Studies at the University of North Carolina.  

A translation from the Latin text was produced by Cameron Rhoades, a Latin professor at Tyndale Theological Seminary in Ft. Worth, Texas.    

These two translations differ substantially because of the underlying texts.

References

7th-century Christian texts
Texts in Syriac
Rapture